His Wife may refer to:
 His Wife (1915 film), an American silent drama film
 His Wife (2014 film), a French psychological drama film